Jalakandapuram is a panchayat town in the Salem district of the Indian state of Tamil Nadu and has an average elevation of .

Demographics
As of the updated 2011 Indian census, The town had a population of 16184 divided in 15 wards of which male population is 8138 and female with 8046, also 9.41 percent of population is under six years of age. The literacy rate is 81.52 percent, which is slightly higher than the state average of 80.09 percent while the sex ratio is 989 comparable to state ratio of 996. Literacy stands at 87.93 percent for men and 75.06 percent for women. 95.45 percent of total population describe their job as the main work, accounting 1739 females in the workforce.

Schedule Caste (SC) and Schedule Tribe (ST) constitutes 2.16 percent and 0.05 percent of total population in the town.

Climate

Government and politics

Civic Administration  
Jalakandapuram town Panchayat has total administration over 4,198 houses to which it supplies basic amenities like water and sewerage. It is also authorized to build roads within town panchayat limits and impose taxes on properties coming under its jurisdiction.

Economy 
Major banks in India have branches in Jalakandapuram.  Small business like groceries shop, fruit Shop and petty Shop are also available. 

Manufacture of different sarees and dress materials are done here. Most of it is sold to big showrooms. They are also exported to other countries and sold in local retail market. Here many people keep power loom in their own house for manufacturing sarees and selling it to manufacturers.

Reference 

Cities and towns in Salem district